F major (or the key of F) is a major scale based on F, with the pitches F, G, A, B, C, D, and E. Its key signature has one flat. Its relative minor is D minor and its parallel minor is F minor. 

The F major scale is: 

F major is the home key of the English horn, the basset horn, the horn in F, the trumpet in F and the bass Wagner tuba. Thus, music in F major for these transposing instruments is written in C major. Most of these sound a perfect fifth lower than written, with the exception of the trumpet in F which sounds a fourth higher. (The basset horn also often sounds an octave and a fifth lower.)

Notable compositions in F major

Antonio Vivaldi
Trio sonata Op. 1/5 for two violins and basso continuo, RV 69
Violin sonata Op. 2/4, RV 20
Violin sonata Op. 5/1, RV 18
Violin concerto Op. 3/7 from L'estro armonico, for four violins and orchestra, RV 567
Violin concerto Op. 4/9 from La Stravaganza, RV 284
Violin concerto Op. 7/10, Il Ritiro, RV 294
Violin concerto Op. 8/3, Autumn from The four seasons, RV 293
Flute concerto Op. 10/1, RV 433, La tempesta di mare
 Flute concerto Op. 10/5, RV 434
Johann Sebastian Bach
Italian Concerto in F major, BWV 971
Brandenburg Concertos Nos. 1 & 2, BWV 1046–1047
Wolfgang Amadeus Mozart
Piano Concerto No. 19, K. 459
Piano Sonata No. 12, K. 332/300k
String Quartet No. 23, K. 590
Violin Sonata No. 24, K. 376
Violin Sonata No. 36, K. 547
Oboe Quartet, K. 370/368b
Ludwig van Beethoven
Symphony No. 6, Op. 68 ("Pastoral")
Symphony No. 8, Op. 93
Romance no. 2 for violin and orchestra, Op. 50
String Quartet No. 1, Op. 18/1
String Quartet No. 7, Op. 59/1
String Quartet No. 16, Op. 135
Violin Sonata No. 5, Op. 24 (Frühling)
Piano Sonata No. 6, Op. 10/2
Piano Sonata No. 22, Op. 54
Horn Sonata, Op. 17
Franz Schubert
Octet, D. 803
Mass No. 1, D. 105
Deutsche Messe (German Mass), D 872
Adagio and Rondo Concertante for piano quartet, D. 487
Felix Mendelssohn
Violin Sonata No. 1
Violin Sonata No. 3
Franz Liszt
Transcendental Étude No. 3 "Paysage"
Frédéric Chopin
Ballade No. 2
Étude Op. 10, No. 8 "Sunshine/Encore"
Nocturne Op. 15, No. 1
Étude Op. 25, No. 3 "The Horseman"
Prelude Op. 28, No. 23 "Pleasure Boat"
Waltz Op. 34, No. 3
Charles-Valentin Alkan
Prelude Op. 31, No. 11 "Un petit rien"
Johannes Brahms
Ein Deutsches Requiem, Op. 45
String Quintet No. 1, Op. 88
Symphony No. 3, Op. 90
Cello Sonata No. 2, Op. 99
Anton Bruckner
String Quintet
Maurice Ravel
String Quartet
George Gershwin
Concerto in F
Dmitri Shostakovich
String Quartet No. 3, Op. 73
Piano Concerto No. 2, Op. 102
Antonín Dvořák
Symphony No. 5, Op. 76
String Quartet No. 12 (American Quartet), Op. 96
Duke Ellington
In a Sentimental Mood

See also
Key (music)
Major and minor
Chord (music)
Chord letters

External links

Musical keys
Major scales